Malaxis sampoae  is an Asian species of orchids. It has been found only in Taiwan.

References

Orchids of Taiwan
Plants described in 2011
sampoae
Endemic flora of Taiwan